On November 7, 2011, a Chevron owned oil well began leaking causing  of crude oil to enter the ocean every day. At first, Chevron claimed that the leak was most likely due to a seep in the ocean floor but later admitted that they had made a miscalculation. Chevron says that they underestimated the amount pressure that the reservoir would exert on the oil well and says that heavier mud should have been used to seal the well.  of oil were spilled over the course of four days until the well was finally sealed.

After the oil spill, 18 ships were sent out into the ocean to clean the spill. There was little documented environmental impact, and the oil never reached the shores of Rio. Following the spill, Brazilian prosecutors filed a lawsuit for 40 billion reais ($18 billion), but in September 2013, Chevron and Brazilian officials reached a settlement of 300 million reais ($135 million).

See also 

 Lago Agrio oil field
 Orinoco Mining Arc

References

External links
Dropps.utmsi.utexas.edu
Gulfreasearchinitiative.org

Oil spills in Brazil
2011 in Brazil
2011 in the environment
Environmental disasters in South America
Pollution in Brazil